Tod Lending is an American producer, director, writer and cinematographer.  His work has aired on ABC, PBS, HBO, Al Jazeera English, CNN, A&E; has been screened theatrically and awarded at national and international festivals; and has been televised internationally in Europe and Asia. He is the president and founder of Nomadic Pictures, a documentary film production company based in Chicago, and the Executive Director of Ethno Pictures, a nonprofit film company that produces and distributes educational films.

Career 

Mr. Lending's feature-length documentary, Legacy, which he produced, directed, wrote, and photographed was nominated for an Academy Award in 2001]. Legacy tells the inspiring story of how members of one African-American family, filmed over a five-year period, recovered from the loss of their child, broke free from welfare, overcame addiction, and escaped the specter of violence in their community. The film aired on Cinemax/HBO in the summer of 2000, was a critical success at the Sundance Film Festival 2000, and received a prime-time national PBS release in fall 2002. The film was awarded the Real Screen Innovation in Documentary Award, was nominated for a national Emmy and two IDA awards and was broadcast internationally. In addition, Legacy inspired the creation and passing of federal housing legislation on behalf of grandparents rearing their grandchildren. The Transportation, Treasury, and Housing and Urban Development appropriations bill signed into law on November 30, 2005 included $4 million for LEGACY Housing Demonstrations.

Mr. Lending also directed, co-series produced, wrote, and co-edited the international award-winning PBS series No Time to be a Child, a $1.4 million three-part documentary series that aired nationally on PBS and was a co-production with Detroit Public Television. The series of documentaries are about children overcoming the effects and consequences of violence in war-zone communities, their homes, and in situations of poverty. In addition to Lending's national Emmy for the ABC Afterschool Special Shades of a Single Protein, documentaries in the No Time to be a Child series (Growin’ Up Not A Child, Breaking Ties, and Time to Speak) have garnered Lending numerous awards including a national Emmy nomination for Outstanding Documentary and several Casey Medals for Meritorious Journalism, New York Festival World Medals, Cine Eagles, among others.

Lending's Emmy nominated and multi-award-winning feature-length documentary, entitled OMAR & PETE, followed two men before their release from prison, and then two years thereafter. The film that he produced and directed examines the social and economic barriers that these men confront as they work at reintegrating into their communities and families. The project aired nationally on PBS through the POV series and garnered major support from the Annie E. Casey Foundation, the MacArthur Foundation, the Corporation for Public Broadcasting, and the Foundation for Child Development through a Journalism Fellowship in Child and Family Policy.

Lending also was the co-producer, cinematographer and director of the national PBS award-winning short, ROSEVELT’S AMERICA. Shot over two years, this inspiring story is about a Liberian refugee who, after surviving torture and losing his home, brought his family to the US to rebuild their lives. AIMEE’S CROSSING, (producer, director, cinematographer) is also a half-hour film that aired nationally on PBS. It follows a female juvenile offender through her therapy inside prison, and her parole on the outside.

In 2008, Lending was awarded a 1.5 million dollar grant by the Wallace Foundation to produce, direct and photograph a documentary film and outreach project for PBS entitled, The Principal Story.  This film follows two very passionate and committed public school principals as they relentlessly work to improve the educational standards for their students, over 98% of them coming from families living below the poverty line. The film aired on the Emmy-winning PBS series, POV. In addition, the film was licensed by the U.S. State Department and is being distributed to over 150 U.S. consulates around the world. A multi-year outreach project successfully used the film to influence school leadership throughout the country.

Most recently, he produced, directed and photographed the feature documentary, All the Difference, a film inspired by Wes Moore's book, The Other Wes Moore., about educating young low-income African American men. While exploring issues of education and manhood, the film follows two determined young black men for five years from the time they graduate high school through college. This film is a co-production with POV, the PBS Emmy award-winning series, and aired nationally on PBS in September 2016. This film has received major support from the MacArthur Foundation, Corporation for Public Broadcasting, Annie E. Casey Foundation, Richard H. Dreihaus Foundation.

Lending was also commissioned by the Sundance Film Institute to produce, direct and photograph the 5-minute short, Vezo (which means: to live with the sea). Shot in Madagascar, Vezo is narrated by Narcia, the 14-year-old daughter of a Vezo family. She tells the story of their survival in the style of a fable. Documentary footage and the magic of sand animation are used to illustrate her story. In this simple fable, the solution to the family's survival becomes an archetypal lesson that can be applied to other situations of poverty and hunger on coastlines throughout the world. Vezo premiered at the Sundance Film Festival 2014 and was awarded the Hilton Sustainability Award.

Films

Saul & Ruby: Life is a Cabaret (in production)

This feature doc tracks the origins, exploits, and members of the Holocaust Survivor Band over the course of two years as it tours nationally and abroad. It's a film about life's beauty, joys, traumas and struggles – and having the courage to live one's dreams.

While the Holocaust is a central part of the back-story, the core of this film is about finding purpose in one's life; the transcendent power of music; the experience of aging and facing one's mortality; the impact of surviving war and past traumas; and the power of family and what it means to be Jewish in today's world.

All the Difference (2016)

Inspired by Wes Moore's New York Times bestselling book, The Other Wes Moore, Academy Award-nominated and national Emmy-winning producer/director Tod Lending has produced and directed All The Difference, a feature-length documentary film, and media outreach project, that explores critical issues and offers insights and solutions related to African-American manhood.

Filmed over five and a half years, All The Difference weaves together the stories of two tough, yet promising young black men as they navigate their lives in broken homes and low-income, high-risk communities in Chicago. Statistics predict they will drop out of high school and succumb to life on the streets; but both graduate and go on to college in spite of all the odds. After they graduate, the film follows them for another 6 months as they both find meaningful work in community service.

The film explores the factors in their lives (education, parents and grandparents, teachers, role models, personal drive and community support) that made All The Difference in helping them be the first in their families to most likely escape poverty and secure a place in the middle class.

This national PBS film is a coproduction with POV and is part of American Graduate Initiative: Let's Make It Happen, a national public media initiative made possible by the Corporation for Public Broadcasting (CPB).

Legacy (2000)

Produced, directed and written by Tod Lending, Legacy is the unprecedented portrait of an African-American family that dramatically captures their successes and failures as they struggle to overcome the devastating effects of poverty, welfare, and community violence. For four generations the Collins family has depended on welfare and lived in Chicago's Henry Horner Homes, one of the most dangerous housing projects in America. Through the powerful voices of three generations of African-American women, Legacy tells the story of a mother, two daughters, and a grand daughter who are struggling to break free from poverty, welfare, drug addiction and the violence in their community.

This compelling and uplifting story reveals the complexities of poverty, welfare, drug abuse, and human resilience from an African-American perspective.

Omar & Pete (2005)

Omar & Pete are determined to change their lives. Both had been in and out of prison for more than 30 years – never out longer than six months. This intimate and penetrating film follows these two long-time friends for several years after what they hope will be their final prison release. In that time, their lives take divergent paths as one wrestles with addiction and fear while the other finds success and freedom through helping others.

The film provides a rare glimpse into an intimate web of support. Case managers, many of them former addicts and ex-prisoners themselves, dedicate themselves to the mission of redemption, empowering one man at a time. They want to help each man take hold of his opportunity, resurrect misused talents and build a satisfying, productive life in society.

This honest and unflinching portrait shows how challenging life on the outside can be for men who’ve lived much of their lives behind bars. It is a story of what can happen when support is offered – and accepted. And it reveals that no matter how much support is given – pride, pain and fear are the demons that every man must face within himself.

The Principal Story (2009)

The Principal Story, a $1.5 million national multiplatform broadcast film and outreach project, was selected for full funding by The Wallace Foundation in response to its RFP to help elevate the visibility of leadership as a lever for school improvement. The Foundation was seeking a film that would provide compelling and credible stories of principals and their leadership teams whose work could result in schoolwide improvement and academic achievement for youth. With a focus on the vital and changing role of school leadership, the project's objectives are to raise awareness; educate and motivate key audiences, including opinion leaders in policy and education; provide resources; and spur collaboration and action. Since 2002, improving education leadership at all levels of the system – state, district, and school – has been the sole focus of The Wallace Foundation's efforts in education.

The Principal Story is a 60-minute documentary about public school leadership and learning seen through the eyes of two very dynamic and passionate principals, one in the Chicago Public School System, and one in Springfield, IL. Following these two principals and schools in depth for one year, the film reveals the complex social and political dynamics that connect children, parents, teachers, principals, principal supervisors, school system executive officers, and elected officials. The Principal Story takes the viewer along for a compelling, passion-filled ride that reveals what effective educational leadership looks like in the 21st century. Produced and directed by Tod Lending, Nomadic Pictures, and David Mrazek, the film is projected to air on PBS in fall 2009.

Studies have shown that student success in struggling schools relies heavily on the effective leadership of the principal. In The Principal Story, all three leaders oversee a majority of low-income student populations facing the testing challenges of the No Child Left Behind Act. Their schools offer distinctly different educational environments, with the unique challenges of different age/grade levels and class sizes. Each principal is at different phases in her career; their leadership styles reflect this.

Vezo (2014)

Until recently, as a result of overfishing, the people living on the southwest coast of Madagascar, known as the “Vezo” (which means: to live with the sea) were on the edge of losing their ability to survive and feed their families. The Vezo are semi-nomadic fishers who depend exclusively on the marine environment for their food, livelihood and cultural identity. Octopus is a major cash crop for the Vezo, but until recently stocks of octopus and fish were in precipitous decline due to overfishing.

In the short film, Vezo the 14-year-old daughter of a Vezo family, Narcia, tells the story of their survival in the style of a fable. In simple and poetic terms she describes how things were before she was born, and then what happened afterwards. She begins: “Before I was born people used to say: go out with a boat and you will come back with a boat full of fish. Go to the reef and you will come back with all of the octopus you need.” She goes on to explain that when she was born villages were growing in size, families were getting bigger and there were more mouths to feed. As a result, the fish and octopus began to dwindle. Then scientists, who had heard of their plight, came to Madagascar and worked beside them. The Vezo learned how to rotate their fishing grounds, avoid hunting octopus for a season and how to plant seaweed which would not only become a crash crop for them but would supplement their livelihood, further relieving the pressure on fishing and octopus hunting.

Narcia's story is told in live action footage filmed on location in Madagascar and also through the magic of sand animation. When she refers to the world beneath the sea, sand animation is used to express the beauty of this underworld as well as the dangers of overfishing. Above water, powerful live action images capture the Vezo fishing, the villages on the coastline, the sea, and Narcia looking straight into the camera as she tells her story.

Narcia's family and community have learned to survive. But poverty and hunger threatens approximately 500 million people worldwide whose survival depends on small-scale fisheries. By presenting Narcia's story as a simple fable, the solution to the family's survival becomes an archetypal lesson that can be applied to other situations of poverty and hunger on coastlines throughout the world.

Burden of Silence (2012)

Donna Erikson is a Native Alaskan woman and a survivor of sexual abuse. She, and those who share this devastating history, are now embracing the transformative power of lifting the Burden of Silence within their community by speaking out about sexual assault.

In Burden of Silence we hear her story and see, through the work of a Native Alaskan state trooper, the challenging reality of law enforcement for a crime that is so frequently hushed up by victim and victimizer alike.

In This Room (2013)

This story unfolds through the prism of the Gray family. Derrell, a father of four, is trying to find a job and restore his family's dignity while his 19-year-old stepson, Lamont, is striving to be seen as just another kid in high school despite his family's homelessness. And then there is the perspective of young Malichi, eight-years old, who is caught up in the chaos with little grasp of why this happening to the people he loves.

Aimee's Crossing (2008)

In 2008, when this film was completed, Female juvenile offenders had the fastest growing rates of incarceration; yet, media access to their stories and lives was extremely limited because they were minors. However, in 2004 Illinois Governor Rod Blagojevich granted veteran documentary filmmaker Tod Lending unprecedented access to female juvenile correctional facilities in Illinois in order to tell the story of one such young woman.

In this very, intimate, honest, and provocative character study, the story of juvenile offender Aimee Meyers unfolds over four years as she struggles to overcome her addictions and destructive behavior. Lending films Aimee through her incarcerations and releases. He captures her therapy sessions, parole board reviews, staff case meetings, life at home and the important relationships she has with her teacher, Jeannie Lewis, and Parole Agent, Mitch Blackart.

In Aimee's Crossing, Lending films how the juvenile justice system contends with her history of domestic and sexual abuse, substance abuse, and mental health issues (she is diagnosed as bipolar). The film is unique in its comprehensive presentation of strategies employed by the justice system to enforce punishment, yet assist youthful wrongdoers in finding a productive path. The successes and failures of the system are exposed throughout the story.

By focusing on one individual, Lending achieves a level of depth and intimacy that could not be achieved by focusing on multiple characters. Aimee's distinctive voice, and the many issues that her story embodies (mental health, abuse, addiction, family dysfunction, education, juvenile criminal justice) will inspire the public to wrestle with these painful realities that are confronting an ever-growing number of young women.

Time to Speak (1998)

Produced, directed and written by Tod Lending, Time to Speak features young survivors who are at different stages of struggling to overcome their experience of abuse and neglect. This dramatic one hour national PBS documentary follows their powerful stories as they unfold in the trauma ward of a hospital; in physical and psychological exams performed at an intake center; and in a residential facility using peer pressure as an innovative approach for healing boys who have been severely physically and sexually abused and who now have become abusers themselves.

This film focuses on how a child overcomes the effects and consequences of abuse and neglect at the hands of those closest to them; captures the reality of what it means to grow up abused and neglected from the child's point of view; shows what choices they make in order to cope with the abuse while illustrating the consequences of those choices; and demonstrates the different ways in which survivors of child maltreatment rebuild their lives following their abusive experiences.

Breaking Ties (1996)

Produced, directed, written and edited by Tod Lending, Breaking Ties is a one-hour national PBS documentary focusing on three kids who are breaking their families’ ties to poverty in the US. Nicole, 16 years old, lives in a poor section of Chicago. Her family has depended on welfare for 4 generations. She wants to be the first in her family to end that legacy. Demetrio, 17 years old, has worked the crops between Florida and Michigan since he was a young child. He's a second generation migrant farmworker who is struggling to stay in school while working the fields. His dream is to one day become an architect. Chris, 14 years old, was once middle class and living in a small town in the Sierra mountains of California. He's now homeless, living on the outskirts of Los Angeles, and searching for a place he can call home. Breaking Ties takes us inside the lives of these three kids, telling the story from their unique point of view while showing how poverty has molded their sense of the world and their future in it.

Growin' Up Not a Child (1995)

Produced, directed, written and edited by Tod Lending, Growin’ Up Not a Child enters the violent living conditions of urban America and exposes communal violence on a scale that we never thought was possible in the U.S. Filmed in Chicago, it follows the lives of children living in dangerous communities who are making decisions that will affect the rest of their lives. This one hour national PBS documentary examines what support structures these children need in order to overcome their predicaments; what effects their surroundings have on their cognitive and emotional development; and how they make sense of the seemingly senseless brutality that they witness in their daily lives. The program is told from the point of view of the child. Their stories afford a rare and intimate, and ultimately powerful portrait that will challenge the viewer to reshape their thinking about what these children need in order to have healthy and productive lives.

Rosevelt's America (2005)

Rosevelt's America is a cinema verite profile of the struggles of a Liberian refugee to build a new life in America. After being tortured and narrowly escaping execution during Liberia's civil war, Rosevelt Henderson makes his way to America with three of his children but is forced to leave his pregnant wife behind. He works as a janitor, airport van driver, and assembly line worker in order to support his family and help his wife flee their war-torn country. After two years of juggling low wage jobs, Rosevelt's perseverance pays off and he is reunited with his wife, Frances, and his baby daughter. By capturing Rosevelt's day-to-day struggles, frustrations, and achievements, viewers come to appreciate the distance he has traveled during his harrowing journey from torture and desperation in his native Liberia to security and stability in his newly adopted homeland. Ultimately, Rosevelt's America becomes an inspiring story of quiet determination and dignity under duress.

Modern Cool

Chicago based, vocalist-songwriter-pianist Patricia Barber has earned a reputation as a fiercely independent artist who has paid enough dues to creatively call the shots on the kind of albums she wants to make. She has been in the vanguard of the new school of female jazz vocalists who in the past decade have been exploring intriguing improvisational terrain beyond classic balladry and bop-infused standards. Thus far, her recording intuition has been impeccable, winning over local fans as well as establishing her a strong support base internationally. Modern Cool is a promotional short performance and interview documentary that captures Barber performing several hits from her highly acclaimed CD.

Haiti

On January 12, 2010 a devastating earthquake hit Haiti. More than 220,000 people were killed and over 300,000 were injured. Of those who survived, many were suffering from various forms of PTSD. One year after the tragedy the Center for Mind Body Medicine arrived in Haiti to train healthcare workers in how to deal with the effects of PTSD. Using a combination of therapies including talk therapy, meditation, yoga and other body movement techniques, they taught healthcare workers how to heal their patients as well as themselves. CMBM hired Nomadic Pictures to make a series of short films that would capture their humanitarian work.

Personal 

Lending was a University of Maryland Journalism Fellow in Child and Family Policy and an advisor at the Sundance Institute. He lives in Chicago, with his daughter Daria.

Filmography 

 Saul & Ruby: Life is a Cabaret (in production)
 All The Difference (Feature and TV documentary - PBS - POV) (2016)
 Legacy (Feature and TV documentary - HBO) (2000)
 Omar & Pete (Feature and TV documentary - PBS - POV) (2005)
 The Principal Story (TV series documentary - PBS - POV) (2009)
 Vezo (2014)
 Burden of Silence (TV series documentary - Al Jazeera Network - Witness) (2012)
 In This Room (Al Jazeera Network) (2013)
 Aimee's Crossing (TV documentary - PBS) (2008)
 Time to Speak (TV documentary - PBS) (1998)
 Breaking Ties (TV documentary - PBS) (1996)
 Growin' Up Not a Child (TV documentary - PBS) (1995)
 Rosevelt's America (TV documentary - PBS) (2005)
 Modern Cool
 Haiti

References

External links 

  
 Official Facebook Page
 

American film directors
Living people
Year of birth missing (living people)